USS Estelle (SP-747), later USS SP-747, was a United States Navy patrol vessel commissioned in 1917 and stricken in 1933.

Estelle was built as a private motorboat of the same name. The U.S. Navy acquired her in 1917 for use as a section patrol vessel in World War I. She apparently was commissioned that year as USS Estelle (SP-747).

Little information is available regarding Estelles naval career. Apparently she saw service as a section patrol boat somewhere along the coast of the United States for the rest of World War I. She was renamed USS SP-747 sometime in 1918.

On 23 June 1919, a dispatch directed the Commandant, 3rd Naval District, to ship SP-747 and the patrol boat  to the Culver Naval School in Culver, Indiana. Like Ahdeek, she presumably operated there on loan from the Navy for many years, because she was not stricken from the Navy Directory until sometime in 1933, the same year Ahdeek was stricken.

Notes

References
  (for USS Ahdeek)
SP-747 Estelle at Navy History and Heritage Command Online Library of Selected Images: U.S. Navy Ships -- Listed by Hull Number: "SP" #s and "ID" #s -- World War I Era Patrol Vessels and other Acquired Ships and Craft numbered from SP-700 through SP-799
SP-747 Estelle at NavSource Online: Section Patrol Craft (SP) and Civilian Vessels (ID) Index

Patrol vessels of the United States Navy
World War I patrol vessels of the United States